Tylomelania carota is a species of freshwater snail with an operculum, an aquatic gastropod mollusk in the family Pachychilidae.

Distribution 
This species occurs in the Kalaena River drainage, Sulawesi, Indonesia.

Ecology 
Tylomelania carota is a riverine species.

References

carota
Gastropods described in 1898